Leucine-rich repeat (LRR) protein SHOC-2 is a protein that in humans is encoded by the SHOC2 gene. The best-studied role of SHOC2 is in modulating  signals of the extracellular signal-regulated kinase 1 and 2 (ERK1/2) pathway by forming a holophosphatase complex that activates RAF proteins(). This protein was initially identified in Caenorhabditis elegans as SUR-8/SOC2 and was found to be a critical positive regulator of the ERK1/2 signaling pathway that integrates the Ras and RAF components of the ERK1/2 pathway into a multiprotein complex. Specifically, SHOC2 tethers RAS and PP1C proteins and in close proximity to RAF to dephosphorylate “S259” to enable MAPK signaling. It has been shown that activity that results in lipidation (specifically Myristoylation) of SHOC2 can cause Noonan syndrome.

Interactions 

SHOC2 has been shown to interact with the catalytic phosphatase subunit PP1C() and MRAS as well as canonical RAS isoforms (H/K/NRAS)(). The ternary complex SHOC2-RAS-PP1C functions to dephosphorylate an inhibitory phosphorylation site ('S259') on RAF family proteins to enable MAPK signaling().

SHOC2 Dependent Dynamic Regulation of MAPK signaling 
The amplitude of SHOC2-mediated ERK1/2 signals has been proposed to be regulated by differential regulation of RAF activation at the plasma membrane and internalized endosome compartment as well an alternative model proposing post-translational modifications(). SHOC2 ubiquitination mediated by HUWE1 is triggered by growth factor activation of the ERK1/2 pathway and is a prerequisite for the subsequent ubiquitination of the RAF-1 kinase associated with SHOC2. However, the current data has yet to address how these ubiquitin modifications regulate the SHOC2 holophosphatase function to reduce the amplitude of RAF-ERK1/2 signals.

References

Further reading 

 
 

Proteins